Elnes is a commune in the Pas-de-Calais department in the Hauts-de-France region of France.

Geography
A farming village situated 9 miles (14 km) southwest of Saint-Omer, at the D225 and D132 crossroads.

Population

Places of interest
 The church of St.Martin, dating from the sixteenth century.

See also
Communes of the Pas-de-Calais department

References

External links

 Statistical data, INSEE

Communes of Pas-de-Calais